The 2000 FIFA Futsal World Championship was the fourth FIFA Futsal World Championship, the quadrennial international futsal championship contested by the men's national teams of the member associations of FIFA. It was held between 18 November and 3 December 2000 in Guatemala. It was the first FIFA tournament held in the country.

Spain won the tournament, defeating Brazil in the final. They ended a streak of three straight championships by Brazil and also became the only nation other than the South Americans to win the title at that time.

Qualifying criteria

Qualified nations

Venues

Squads

Each nation submitted a squad of 14 players, including two or three goalkeepers.

First round

Group A
(18 November - 23 November)

Group B
(20 November - 23 November)

Group C
(19 November - 23 November)

Group D
(19 November - 23 November)

Second round

Group E
(26 November - 29 November)

Group F
(25 November - 28 November)

Final round

Semi-finals

Third-place match

Final

Champions

Tournament ranking

External links
FIFA Futsal World Championship Guatemala 2000, FIFA.com
FIFA Technical Report

 
FIFA Futsal World Cup
Fifa Futsal World Championship, 2000
Fifa Futsal World Championship, 2000
International futsal competitions hosted by Guatemala